Chukwuerika "Erik" Ezukanma (born January 25, 2000) is an American football wide receiver for the Miami Dolphins of the National Football League (NFL). He played college football at Texas Tech.

High school career
Ezukanma attended Timber Creek High School in Fort Worth, Texas. In 2015, as a sophomore, he was a second-team all-district selection. The next year, Ezukanma was an AP 6A first-team all-state selection and was named the District 3-6A Offensive MVP. Ezukanma finished his senior season with 37 receptions for 687 yards and nine touchdowns.

On December 20, 2017, Ezukanma signed his letter of intent for Texas Tech as a 4-star recruit.

College career
Ezukanma saw limited playing during his freshman season, appearing in only two games. He caught his first collegiate touchdown from Colt Garret in the Red Raiders' game against Lamar.

Ezukanma was added to the watch list for the Fred Biletnikoff Award in the middle of the 2020 season. On November 28, against Oklahoma State, Ezukanma finished with seven receptions for a career high 183 yards along with two touchdowns. At the end of the season, Ezukanma was named first-team All-Big 12.

Coming into the 2021 season, Ezukanma was included on the preseason watch list for the Maxwell Award and the Fred Biletnikoff Award. He was also selected to the preseason first-team All-Big 12. Ezukanma broke his arm in the spring prior to the season, but was able to play in the team's season opener against Houston, finishing the game with seven receptions for 179 yards. After the conclusion of the regular season, Ezukanma was named second-team All-Big 12.

On December 23, 2021, Ezukanma announced that he would declare for the NFL draft.

College statistics

Professional career

Ezukanma was drafted by the Miami Dolphins in the fourth round (125 overall) of the 2022 NFL Draft.

References

External links
 Miami Dolphins bio
Texas Tech Red Raiders bio

Living people
American football wide receivers
American sportspeople of Nigerian descent
Texas Tech Red Raiders football players
Players of American football from Fort Worth, Texas
2000 births
Miami Dolphins players